Dragoş Balauru (born 11 November 1989) is a Romanian footballer who plays as a goalkeeper for UTA Arad. In the past he played for Romanian clubs such as: FCM Târgu Mureș, Universitatea Cluj, Viitorul Constanța and FC Voluntari, among others.

Personal life
His brother, Dan Balauru is also a footballer.

Honours
FC Voluntari
Liga II: 2014–15
Cupa României: 2016–17
Supercupa României: 2017

UTA Arad
Liga II: 2019–20

References

External links
 
 

1989 births
Living people
People from Teleorman County
Romanian footballers
Association football goalkeepers
Liga I players
ASA 2013 Târgu Mureș players
AS Voința Snagov players
FC Universitatea Cluj players
FC Viitorul Constanța players
FC Voluntari players
Liga II players
Liga III players
ASC Daco-Getica București players
FC Gloria Buzău players
FC Rapid București players
FC UTA Arad players
Super League Greece players
Levadiakos F.C. players
Romanian expatriate footballers
Romanian expatriates in Greece
Expatriate footballers in Greece